Gaborone United Sporting Club (GU) is a football club from Botswana based in Gaborone. It is the only professional sporting club in Botswana. Its official sponsor is Bank Gaborone, who signed a three-year deal at the beginning of the 2022-23 season. It is run and owned partly by Soccer Dynamics. Gaborone United play their home games at several venues.

Honors
Botswana Premier League: 7
 1967, 1969, 1970, 1986, 1990, 2009, 2022
Botswana Challenge Cup: 7
 1968, 1970, 1984, 1985, 1990, 2012, 2020
Botswana Independence Cup: 8
 1978, 1979, 1980, 1981, 1984, 1985, 1992, 1993
Mascom Top 8 Cup: 2
 2013, 2015

Performance in CAF competitions
CAF Champions League: 2 appearance
2010 - Second Round
 2022/23 - Preliminary Round

 African Cup of Champions Clubs: 2 appearances
1987 - Preliminary Round
1991 - Preliminary Round

CAF Confederation Cup: 1 appearance
2010 - Second Round of 16

CAF Cup: 2 appearances
1994 - First Round
1998 - withdrew in First Round

Current squad

Notable former players
 Matlhogonolo "Paymaster" Dintwa
 Chandy Moruti
 City Ntebela
 Joseph Phetogo
 Diphetogo "Dipsey" Selolwane
 Gofhamodimo "City" Senne
 Mandla Balanda
 Thomas "Zero" Johnson
 George Pool
 Nicholas "Lele" Sebele
 Wonderboy Tlape
 Terrence "Terror" Mophuting
 Davis "Professor Mlungisi" Kopi

References

External links
Official website 

Association football clubs established in 1967
Football clubs in Gaborone
1967 establishments in Botswana